Grable is a surname. Notable people with the surname include:

Betty Grable (1916–1973), American dancer, singer, and actress
Joyce Grable (born 1952), American professional wrestler
Judy Grable (1935–2008), American former professional wrestler